Ceromitia ingeminans is a moth of the  family Adelidae or fairy longhorn moths. It was described by Edward Meyrick in 1935. It is found in Congo.

References

Moths described in 1935
Adelidae